Walter A. Johnson (April 3, 1893 – July 23, 1958) was an American football and basketball coach and college athletics administrator. He coached both sports at Presbyterian College in Clinton, South Carolina. As the athletic director at Presbyterian, he is loosely credited with giving the school's sports teams their unique nickname, the Blue Hose.

A native of Milwaukee, Johnson attended South Division High School, where he played football as a fullback. He graduated from the Normal School of Education in Battle Creek, Michigan in 1915.

Johnson died of a heart ailment, on July 23, 1958, at the age of 65, at his home in Clinton. The former football field at Presbyterian was named in his honor.

Head coaching record

Football

References

External links
 

1893 births
1958 deaths
Presbyterian Blue Hose athletic directors
Presbyterian Blue Hose football coaches
Presbyterian Blue Hose men's basketball coaches
South Division High School alumni
Sportspeople from Milwaukee
Coaches of American football from Wisconsin
Basketball coaches from Wisconsin